Belonophora talbotii is a species of flowering plant in the family Rubiaceae. It is found in Nigeria, Cameroon and Gabon. It is threatened by habitat loss.

References

External links
World Checklist of Rubiaceae

talbotii
Flora of Nigeria
Vulnerable plants
Taxonomy articles created by Polbot
Taxa named by Ronald William John Keay